Sophia Ann Elizabeth Smale (born 8 December 2004) is a Welsh cricketer who currently plays for Wales, Western Storm and Oval Invincibles. She plays as a slow left-arm orthodox bowler and right-handed batter.

Early life
Smale was born on 8 December 2004 in Newport. She attends Haberdashers' Monmouth School for Girls, and plays club cricket for Newport Cricket Club. She has also played hockey for Wales at age group level.

Domestic career
Smale made her county debut in 2021, for Wales against Warwickshire in the Women's Twenty20 Cup. She played four matches for the side in the competition, scoring 47 runs and taking 1 wicket. She was ever-present for the side in the 2022 Women's Twenty20 Cup, playing 7 matches and taking 5 wickets.

Smale was named in the Western Storm Academy squad for 2021. She scored 83 from 77 balls in a 50-over match against North West Thunder Academy in June 2021. She was again named in the Storm Academy for the 2022 season, but was promoted to the first team squad in May 2022. She made her debut for the side on 18 May 2022, against Sunrisers in the Charlotte Edwards Cup. She went on to  play the rest of the Charlotte Edwards Cup campaign for the side, taking four wickets at an average of 28.00. She was also ever-present for the side in the Rachael Heyhoe Flint Trophy, taking two wickets, as well as scoring 133 runs at an average of 44.33. She scored her maiden half-century during the Rachael Heyhoe Flint Trophy, scoring 59 against Northern Diamonds.

In July 2022, Smale signed for Oval Invincibles for the 2022 season of The Hundred, as an injury replacement player for Emma Jones. She played all seven matches for the side as they won the competition, and she was the side's joint-leading wicket-taker, with eight wickets at an average of 18.25. During the tournament, she was named as the "summer's breakout star", citing her dismissals of players such as Alyssa Healy and Sophie Devine during The Hundred. At the end of the 2022 season, it was announced that Smale had signed her first professional contract with Western Storm.

International career
In October 2022, Smale was selected in the England Under-19 squad for the 2023 ICC Under-19 Women's T20 World Cup. She took eight wickets at an average of 9.62 at the tournament, including best bowling figures of 3/11, taken against Ireland.

References

External links

Living people
2004 births
Sportspeople from Newport, Wales
Welsh women cricketers
Wales women cricketers
Western Storm cricketers
Oval Invincibles cricketers